April Maze is a 1930 short animated cartoon featuring Felix the Cat. It was produced by Pat Sullivan.

Plot
Felix brings his nephews Inky and Winky to the park for a picnic. However, they always seem to be delayed. While they say their grace, a rabbit gets a snake to steal their meal. When they try to get it back, it rains so they must go back home. The rain stops and the three continue to the picnic. It rains again for a short while, but then it gets better. They say their grace again before eating, and someone else steals their meal. Felix runs after the culprit however, he can't catch him. At the end of the story, a stork comes with a picnic basket. Hoping the stork has found his meal, Felix opens the basket with joy, but he finds out it is just more kittens who jump about as the cartoon ends.

Inky and Winky
Inky and Winky make their most famous theatrical appearance in this short, which is occasionally mistaken for their only appearance. They actually debuted in Felix the Cat Weathers the Weather (1926), returning in several more 1920s shorts before April Maze. Sometimes three kittens were used, in which case the third was called Dinky. In Eskimotive (1928), Inky appeared solo.

In the 1950s, two nephews appeared with Felix in their own comic books. There Inky and Dinky were used. The most common pairing of Inky and Winky began several years later.

Although Felix's nephews do not appear in the early-1960s and mid-1990s TV series, they have a considerable role in the online comics, making them among the principal characters in the Felix media.

See also
 Felix the Cat filmography

References

External links

April Maze at the Big Cartoon Database

1930 films
1930s American animated films
1930 animated films
1930s animated short films
Felix the Cat films
American black-and-white films
Picnic films
Films directed by Otto Messmer